Marian or Marion Mitchell may refer to:
Marion Mitchell (born 1941), English pop singer, stage name Janie Jones
Marion Mitchell (singer) (1876–1955), New Zealand civic and charitable organiser
Marion Mitchell, Spanish film actress during 1950s (1954's Sister Angelica)
Marion Bonner Mitchell (1926–2014), American literary historian
Marian Houghton Mitchell (1895–1986), Anglo-Irish author, pen name Mairin Mitchell
Marion Juliet Mitchell (1836–1917), American poet and educator

See also
Mary Mitchell (disambiguation)